

This is a list of the National Register of Historic Places listings in Hampden County, Massachusetts.

This is a list of the properties and districts on the National Register of Historic Places in Hampden County, Massachusetts, United States. Latitude and longitude coordinates are provided for many National Register properties and districts; these locations may be seen together in a map.

There are 166 properties and districts listed on the National Register in the county, including 3 National Historic Landmarks. The city of Springfield is the location of 90 of these properties and districts, including 1 of the National Historic Landmarks; they are listed separately, while the remaining 76 properties and districts, including 2 National Historic Landmarks, are listed here.

Current listings

Springfield

Outside Springfield

|}

Former listing

|}

See also
 
 List of National Historic Landmarks in Massachusetts
 National Register of Historic Places listings in Massachusetts

References

 
Hampden County